The Venucia Xing or Venucia Star
 is a compact crossover SUV produced by Venucia, a subsidiary of the Dongfeng Nissan joint venture.

History

The Xing was presented at the Auto Guangzhou in November 2019. It has been on sale in mainland China since April 2020.

Technical specifications
It is also available with a 48-volt electrical system for an additional charge.

References

External links
 Official Website

Xing
Compact sport utility vehicles
Crossover sport utility vehicles
Front-wheel-drive vehicles
2020s cars
Cars introduced in 2019